Sibuyanella is a genus of beetles in the family Buprestidae, the jewel beetles. They are native to the Philippines.

Species include:

 Sibuyanella bakeri (Fisher, 1924)
 Sibuyanella boudanti Bellamy, 2005
 Sibuyanella mimica Bellamy, 2005

References

Insects of the Philippines
Buprestidae genera